The Torneio Rei Dadá, was a friendly tournament organized by municipality of Uberlândia to celebrate the reopening of the Estádio Parque do Sabiá. The name of the competition was a tribute to Dadá Maravilha, one of the greatest players of the Minas Gerais football history.

Participants 

All clubes are invited

São Paulo FC first goalkeeper goal 

The competition regulations provided for a curiosity: in case of a penalty foul signaled by the referee, the penalty taker should necessarily be the goalkeeper of the benefited team. This fact occurred in the match between Uberlândia and São Paulo, when the goalkeeper Moscatto scored the goal of the São Paulo's victory. The event took place about a year and a half before Rogério Ceni scored his first goal.

Tournament 

The tournament was held in knockout mode:

See also 

1995 São Paulo FC season
List of goals scored by Rogério Ceni
List of goalscoring goalkeepers

References  

1995 in Brazilian football
Defunct football competitions in Brazil